Hârtop is a commune located in Suceava County, Romania. It is composed of a single village, Hârtop, that was part of Preutești commune until 2004.

References

Communes in Suceava County
Localities in Western Moldavia